The Cape caco or Cape dainty frog (Cacosternum capense) is a species of frog in the family Pyxicephalidae.
It is endemic to South Africa.
Its natural habitats are Mediterranean-type shrubby vegetation, subtropical or tropical dry lowland grassland, freshwater marshes, intermittent freshwater marshes, arable land, pastureland, and canals and ditches.
It is threatened by habitat loss.

References

Cacosternum
Endemic amphibians of South Africa
Taxonomy articles created by Polbot
Amphibians described in 1925